The Tangwang language  is a variety of Mandarin Chinese heavily influenced by the Mongolic Santa language (Dongxiang). It is spoken in a dozen or so villages in Dongxiang Autonomous County, Gansu Province, China. The linguist Mei W. Lee-Smith calls this creole language the "Tangwang language", based on the names of the two largest villages (Tangjia 唐家 and Wangjia 汪家, parts of Tangwang town) where it is spoken.

Speakers
According to Lee-Smith (1996), the Tangwang language is spoken by about 20,000 people living in the north-eastern part of the Dongxiang Autonomous County (Tangwang town). These people self-identify as Dongxiang (Santa) or Hui people. The Tangwang speakers don't speak Dongxiang language.

Description
The Tangwang language uses mostly Mandarin words and morphemes with Dongxiang grammar. Besides Dongxiang loanwords, Tangwang also has a substantial number of Arabic and Persian loanwords.

Like standard Mandarin, Tangwang is a tonal language. However, grammatical particles, which are typically borrowed from Mandarin but used in the way Dongxiang morphemes would be used in Dongxiang, do not carry tones.

For example, while the Mandarin plural suffix  has only very restricted usage (it can be used with personal pronouns and some nouns related to people), Tangwang uses it, in the form , universally, the way Dongxiang would use its plural suffix . The Mandarin pronoun  can be used in Tangwang as a possessive suffix (meaning "your").

Unlike Mandarin, but like Dongxiang, Tangwang has grammatical cases as well (but only four of them, instead of eight in Dongxiang).

The word order of Tangwang is the same as Dongxiang subject–object–verb form.

Tangwang combines the characteristics of Mandarin Chinese and Dongxiang Mongolian. The hybrid language is a symbol of language blending. According to Lee-Smith, the blending is caused by the Silk Road.

See also
Wutun language

References

Further reading

 
 

Chinese-based pidgins and creoles
Languages of China
Mandarin Chinese
Mongolian language
Varieties of Chinese